Kung Fu Panda: The Dragon Knight is an American CG-animated streaming television series, developed by Mitch Watson and Peter Hastings for Netflix. It is the third TV series in the Kung Fu Panda franchise, following Kung Fu Panda: The Paws of Destiny. Produced by DreamWorks Animation Television, the series premiered on Netflix on July 14, 2022. A second season was released on January 12, 2023.

Premise
The series picks up a few years after the events of Kung Fu Panda 3 and Kung Fu Panda: The Paws of Destiny where Po the giant panda must leave his home and embark on a globe-trotting quest across China for redemption and justice that finds him partnered up with a no-nonsense English knight named Luthera (a brown bear), also known as Wandering Blade, to find 4 elemental weapons that broke up the world a long time ago.

Voice cast

 Jack Black as Po
 Rita Ora as Sir Luthera / Wandering Blade
 Kai Zen as young Sir Luthera
 Chris Geere as Klaus Dumont
 Della Saba as Veruca Dumont
 James Hong as Mr. Ping
 Rahnuma Panthaky as Rukhmini
 Ed Weeks as Colin
 Parry Shen as Weimin
 Todd Haberkorn as Emperor
 Deepti Gupta as Diya
 Anjali Bhimani as Padma
 Sean T. Krishnan as Jayesh
 Richard Ayoade as Kyle
 JB Blanc as Nigel
 Harvey Guillén as Pelpel
 Shohreh Aghdashloo as Forouzan
 Melissa Villaseñor as Akna
 Sarah-Nicole Robles as Queen Zuma
 Stephanie Hsu as Zhen
 Kinza Khan as Rabia
 Omid Abtahi as Alfie
 Amy Hill as Pei Pei
 Tru Valentino as Chuntao
 Stephanie Sheh as Elder Huang
 James Sie as Lao / Lian 
 Martin Aistrope as Master Mastodon
 Barbara Goodson as Queen
 Dayci Brookshire as Changpu
 Rolonda Watts as High Priestess
 Nolan North as Shoddy Boat Owner
 Mick Wingert as Drake / Rabia's Father
 Carlos Alazraqui as Amoch
 Jorge Diaz as B'ah / Pax

Episodes

Season 1 (2022)

Season 2 (2023)

Production

Development

During National Panda Day in March 2022, DreamWorks and Netflix announced a new CGI animated Kung-Fu Panda series, with Jack Black reprising his role as Po from the films and serving as executive producer with Peter Hastings (The Epic Tales of Captain Underpants) and Shaunt Nigoghossian (Be Cool, Scooby-Doo!), while story edited and co-exective produced by Kipo writers Chris Amuck and Ben Mekler. 

The concept idea for the series began as a road buddy comedy that takes the viewers all over in pursuit of their goal to try and catch the bad guys. Jack Black had a cool vision for what an epic journey would be, one that fits well from the first Kung Fu Panda film while having a darker, more mature tone with the show versus past chapters also marks how the series is expanding the franchise. Season 2 expands the concept further to explore Indian culture and Central American culture and deepens the characters made from the first season.

Assets from Paws of Destiny were used to build the sets but some episodes have 2D animation styles based on their own setting. One is rendered as comic graphic art, since an unpublished comic book is the central icon of that particular chapter of the story, and another one has a British-looking, lithograph kind of look.

A score soundtrack from Kevin Lax (The First Purge, Burning Sands) and Robert Lydecker (Iron Fist, Lethal Weapon, Sleepy Hollow, Designated Survivor) was released on July 15 by Back Lot Music.

Animation production services are provided by Technicolor, 88 Pictures (Season 2), and Stella Creative Labs while storyboard services are provided by Dave Enterprises and Kok & Co., Pty, Ltd.

Release
The first season of Kung Fu Panda: The Dragon Knight was released on July 14, 2022, on Netflix. A second season, announced in December 2022, was released on January 12, 2023.

Awards and nominations

References

External links

2022 American television series debuts
2020s American animated television series
American computer-animated television series
American children's animated comedy television series
American children's animated action television series
American children's animated fantasy television series
Animated television shows based on films
Anime-influenced Western animated television series
English-language Netflix original programming
Back Lot Music soundtracks
Kung Fu Panda television series
Martial arts television series
Netflix children's programming
Television series about pandas
Television series based on adaptations
Television series by DreamWorks Animation
Television series by Universal Television